Luz Esther Benítez Rosado (born July 22, 1942), also known as Lucecita, is a Puerto Rican singer, part of the country's new wave popular music. Born in Bayamon, a large city in Puerto Rico, she participated in amateur radio shows.

Benítez's most important career step came in 1969, when she won the Festival de la Cancion Latina (Festival of the Latin Song) in Mexico. She participated with two songs, "Génesis" by G.V. Lloveras and "Energía de mis manos", by M. de Jesús. "Genesis" received the highest points (223) in the festival and Lucecita also won as best dressed performer. Pedro Rivera Toledo's arrangement of Genesis also won as the best arrangement, although the orchestra was conducted by Jose S. Marroquin. The festival was held at the Teatro Ferrocarrilero in Mexico.

Other songs
In the mid-1960s:
"Un lugar para los dos" Spanish, these song was versioned of "I Only Want to Be with You".
"Muévanse todos (El Club del Clan)" Spanish, these song was versioned of "Twist and Shout.

See also

List of Puerto Ricans
History of women in Puerto Rico

References

Further reading

External links
http://lucecita.com

1942 births
Living people
People from Bayamón, Puerto Rico
20th-century Puerto Rican women singers
Latin Grammy Lifetime Achievement Award winners
Women in Latin music